Bohumil Páník (born 31 December 1956) is a Czech football manager.

Páník graduated from pedagogy at Palacký University in Olomouc. As a football player, he played for several lower tier clubs. He began coaching in 2000 taking over FC Tescoma Zlín, at that time in Czech Second League. Three years later he moved to Poland, where he coached Lech Poznań and Pogoń Szczecin in Ekstraklasa and Miedź Legnica in Polish Third League.

In winter of 2014 he was appointed again as a manager of FC Fastav Zlín, replacing Martin Pulpit. In his first season in Zlín, he achieved a promotion to Czech First League. In the 2016/2017 season, Páník advanced with Zlín to the final of the Czech Football Cup, where Zlín beat SFC Opava, thus qualifying for the group stage of UEFA Europa League. For the first time in club history, FC Zlín qualified for European competitions. In the 2017/2018 season he was sacked from Zlín after unsatisfactory league results. He was subsequently hired by FC Baník Ostrava, replacing unsuccessful coach Radim Kučera. Managing Baník in the last ten matches of the 2017/2018 season, he was able to avoid Baník's relegation.

Honours

Managerial
 FC Fastav Zlín
Czech Cup:  2016–17
Czechoslovak Supercup: 2017

 FC Baník Ostrava
Czech Cup runner-up:  2018–19

References

1956 births
People from Přílepy (Kroměříž District)
Czech football managers
FC Baník Ostrava managers
FC Fastav Zlín managers
Lech Poznań managers
Pogoń Szczecin managers
SK Sigma Olomouc managers
Living people
Palacký University Olomouc alumni
Expatriate football managers in Poland
MFK Karviná managers
Sportspeople from the Zlín Region